Alfonso López Caballero (born 17 August 1944) is a Colombian economist and diplomat, the son and grandson of former Presidents of Colombia, Alfonso López Michelsen and Alfonso López Pumarejo respectively, and former congressman, government minister, ambassador to France, Canada, the United Kingdom, and presidential candidate.

Background
Alfonso López Caballero was born in Bogotá, D.C., Colombia, to Alfonso López Michelsen and Cecilia Caballero Blanco on August 17, 1944, during the second presidency of his grandfather Alfonso López Pumarejo. He married on February 22, 1969, in Caracas, Venezuela, to Josefina Milagros Andreu Roca.

Educated first in the traditional Gimnasio Moderno of Bogotá, he finally concluded his secondary education in the United States after following his family into exile in 1952, when during the government of Mariano Ospina Pérez La Violencia against liberals targeted his family and burned down his grandfather's house. Afterwards he attended Georgetown University, his father's alma mater, where he received his Bachelor of Science in International Relations with an specialization in Economics, from then he moved to France where he attended the European Institute for Business Administration, INSEAD and received a Master of Business Administration. He moved back to the United States where he entered Columbia University received his Master's in Economics, re-enlisted as a PhD candidate in Economics but did not finish.

Career
He started his professional career in the economic sector, first as Assistant Manager of CitiBank in Colombia, and then as a consultant for Arthur Young & Co.

López Caballero was ambassador to France, from where he returned to serve president Gaviria as his minister for agriculture. He served as ambassador to Canada and then returned to Colombia to serve as minister of interior.

López Caballero's effectiveness and his lack of interest for the spotlight is what led president Pastrana to appoint him as one of the government's negotiators during the peace process with the FARC communist guerrillas. During the peace negotiations he earned the respect and the trust of the top members of the guerrilla group, mainly due to his clarity, his understanding of the country and its politics, and more importantly, to the sincerity and openness with which López Caballero faced the multiple discussions . Earning this recognition from the FARC was seen as quite remarkable by some commentators given that López Caballero was clearly a representative of the political, social and economic elite of the country .

Going against his father's ideas once again, López Caballero supported Álvaro Uribe from the beginning of his presidential campaign while López Michelsen supported Horacio Serpa. López Caballero was appointed ambassador to the United Kingdom by president Uribe where he was instrumental in strengthening commercial links and in gaining support for an offensive against the guerrillas, paramilitaries and organized crime .

References

1944 births
People from Bogotá
Living people
Alfonso
Children of presidents of Colombia
Colombian Ministers of the Interior
Colombian Ministers of Agriculture
Ambassadors of Colombia to Canada
Ambassadors of Colombia to France
Ambassadors of Colombia to the United Kingdom
Colombian Liberal Party politicians
Members of the Chamber of Representatives of Colombia
Members of the Senate of Colombia
Columbia Graduate School of Arts and Sciences alumni